, abbreviated SPE or SPEJ, is a Japanese film studio, based in Minato-ku, Tokyo. It is a wholly owned subsidiary of Japanese conglomerate Sony Group Corporation, with the majority of SPEJ's shares held by Sony Pictures Entertainment.

Sony Pictures Entertainment Japan and Mitsui & Co.'s joint venture AK Holdings is the majority shareholder of Japanese anime satellite television company Animax Broadcast Japan and Kids Station.

They have also distributed most of Sony Pictures films for Japan, as well as producing some anime and anime films as well.

Anime production

Astro Boy (2003)
Tokyo Godfathers (2003)
Paprika (2006)
Ultraviolet: Code 044 (2008)
Kurozuka (2008)
Viper's Creed (2009)
Marvel Anime (2010–2011)
Iron Man: Rise of Technovore (2013)
Avengers Confidential: Black Widow & Punisher (2014)

Anime Films 
 Dragon Ball Super: Super Hero (2022) (Japanese co-distributor with Toei Company and Asian distributor)

References

External links
Official Website

Mass media companies established in 1984
Sony Pictures Entertainment
Entertainment companies of Japan
Film distributors of Japan
Mass media companies based in Tokyo
Pictures Entertainment Japan
Japanese companies established in 1984